Peter Schindler (born 1960) is a German composer, pianist, keyboardist, organist and author

Peter Schindler may also refer to:

 Peter Schindler (journalist) (1930–2005), Swiss journalist and politician (FDP)